Who Let the Dogs Out is the sixth studio album by Bahamas-based musical group Baha Men. It was released by S-Curve Records and Edel Music in 2000.

Track listing

Charts

Weekly charts

Year-end charts

Certifications and sales

References

2000 albums
Baha Men albums
Artemis Records albums
Albums produced by Steve Greenberg (record producer)
Albums produced by Michael Mangini
Albums produced by Mark Hudson (musician)
Albums produced by Desmond Child